The Entiminae are a large subfamily in the weevil family Curculionidae, containing most of the short-nosed weevils, including such genera as Entimus, Otiorhynchus, Phyllobius, Sitona, and Pachyrrhynchus. In comparison with their stunning diversity, only a few of these weevils are notorious pests of major economic importance. Entimines are commonly encountered in the field, including urban environments, and abundant in entomological collections.

Diversity 
There are over 12000 described species worldwide, distributed in over 1370 genera, nearly 14000 by more recent counts. Most tribes are represented in only one biogeographic region of the world. The current classification within the subfamily has been recognized as artificial rather than reflecting natural groups.

General morphology 
Besides the shape of their broad and short rostrum, most entimines are easily recognized by the presence of a mandibular scar that appears when a deciduous process falls off the mandible, shortly after the emergence of the adult from the pupal stage.

Ecology 
In general, entimines tend to feed on a broad range of plants (polyphagous), but there are instances of oligophagy. In general, the larvae feed externally on roots in the soil and adults feed on foliage. They also show preference for habitat or substrate rather than plant specificity. 

Entimine weevils are primarily associated with angiosperms, but there are also species recorded from gymnosperms. They feed on monocotyledoneous and a broad range of dicotyledoneous plants, including members of the families Fabaceae, Malvaceae, Rutaceae, Solanaceae, and many more.

The most commonly seen/known species are usually those associated with vegetation, where there is a trend to find more abundance and less diversity in cultivated areas, whereas forested or less disturbed areas tend to have more diversity and less abundance; there is a lot of diversity represented in the soil and on leaf litter, which is often overlooked.

The most effective method for collecting entimines from vegetation would be using a beating sheet or by manual collecting; for soil entimines the best method would be leaf litter sifting.

Biology 
Entimines may lay eggs loosely on the substrate, or in clusters glued onto the vegetation  and do not use their rostrum to prepare their oviposition site. Over 50 species of entimines have been reported as parthenogenetic.

The integument of entimines can be black, reddish, orange and even metallic in coloration. Many species of Entiminae are covered by scales arranged in a broad variety of patterns. Those scales bear three dimensional photonic crystals within their lumen, which makes the scales iridescent.

Many species are flightless, which usually can be seen externally: the elytral shoulders (outer anterior corners of the elytra) are reduced to absent in apterous and brachypterous forms and well-developed in species with well-developed wings.

Tribes 
	
The current tribal classification of Entiminae follows Alonso-Zarazaga & Lyal  for the most part, with a few updates by Bouchard et al. The latest tribal addition is the Namaini Borovec & Meregalli. Currently, there are 55 tribes recognized in the subfamily.

A key to identify tribes is presented by Legalov.

 Agraphini
 Alophini 
 Anomophthalmini
 Anypotactini
 Blosyrini
 Brachyderini
 Celeuthetini
 Cneorhinini
 Cratopodini
 Cylydrorhinini 
 Cyphicerini
 Ectemnorhinini
 Elytrurini
 Embrithini
 Entimini
 Episomini
 Eudiagogini
 Eupholini
 Eustylini
 Geonemini
 Holcorhinini
 Hormorini
 Laparocerini
 Leptostethini
 Lordopini
 Mesostylini
 Myorhinini
 Nastini
 Namaini
 Naupactini
 Nothognathini
 Omiini
 Oosomini
 Ophryastini
 Ophtalmorrhynchini
 Otiorhynchini
 Ottistirini
 Pachyrhynchini
 Peritelini
 Phyllobiini
 Polycatini
 Polydrusini
 Premnotrypini
 Pristorhynchini
 Prypnini
 Psallidiini
 Rhyncogonini
 Sciaphilini
 Sitonini
 Tanymecini
 Tanyrhynchini
 Thecesternini
 Trachyphloeini
 Tropiphorini
 Typhlorhinini

References

Further reading
Donald E. Bright, Patrice Bouchard. The Insects and Arachnids of Canada, Part 25: Coleoptera. Curculionidae. Entiminae. Weevils of Canada and Alaska. Vol. 2. Ottawa, NRC Research Press, 2008. .

External links

 
Beetle subfamilies